This is a list of symbols of the United States Commonwealth of Virginia. Most of the items in the list are officially recognized symbols created by an act of the Virginia General Assembly and signed into law by the governor. The state nickname, The Old Dominion, is the oldest symbol. However, it is the only symbol that is not official. The other nickname, "Mother of Presidents", is also historic, as eight Virginians have served as President of the United States, including four of the first five: George Washington, Thomas Jefferson, James Madison, James Monroe, William Henry Harrison, John Tyler, Zachary Taylor, and Woodrow Wilson. Additionally, Sam Houston, president of the Republic of Texas, Fulwar Skipwith, the president of the Republic of West Florida, and Joseph Jenkins Roberts, the first president of Liberia were from Virginia.

The state motto and seal have been official since Virginia declared its independence from the Kingdom of Great Britain. Virginia is one of only two states (the other being Mississippi with the Magnolia) to have the same plant for state flower and state tree, the Flowering Dogwood.  Most of the symbols were made official in the late 20th century.

Insignia

Plants

Animals

Geology

Culture

Notes

The flag was adopted in 1861 after secession from the United States.

The Virginia Colony was nicknamed "The Old Dominion" by King Charles II for its perceived loyalty to the English monarchy during the English Civil War.

Pictures of Virginia license plates throughout the years can be found here.

In 1940, Virginia made "Carry Me Back to Old Virginny" the state song, but it was retired in 1997 and reclassified as the state song emeritus.

See also
Commonwealth of Virginia
List of Virginia-related topics
Lists of United States state insignia

References

External links

State symbols
Virginia